Torre di Mosto is a town in the Metropolitan City of Venice, Veneto, Italy. It is south of SP18.

Sources

(Google Maps)